David Sylvester is president of University of St. Michael's College, University of Toronto, Canada.

Biography
Born in Trail, British Columbia, he attended St. Thomas More Collegiate in Burnaby. He attended St. Francis Xavier University in Antigonish, Nova Scotia, where he also played football. He finished his undergraduate degree at Niagara University in New York, before receiving his Master's and Ph.D. in Medieval Studies from the Jesuit-led Fordham University in New York City. His Ph.D. thesis was entitled, "Maritime communities in pre-plague England: Winchelsea and the Cinque Ports". While at Fordham, Sylvester met his future wife, Allyson Larkin, who was in the same program. Sylvester became the first President of Corpus Christi College and in 2005 was named the Principal of St. Mark's College, also at the University of British Columbia. He was hired to serve as the principal of King's University College in 2009. At the time of his hiring he also served as the vice-chair of the Association of Catholic Colleges and Universities of Canada.

Sylvester was appointed president of University of St. Michael's College University of Toronto and Vice Chancellor of University of Toronto, effective August 1, 2018.

References

External links
King's Herald
Western Communications
 David Sylvester biography

Living people
Sportspeople from Trail, British Columbia
Fordham University alumni
Niagara University alumni
Players of Canadian football from British Columbia
St. Francis Xavier X-Men football players
Academic staff of the University of Western Ontario
Canadian university and college chief executives
Year of birth missing (living people)

bn:অমিত চাকমা